Diliana Georgieva (born 18 February 1965) is a Bulgarian individual rhythmic gymnast. She was one of the Golden Girls of Bulgaria that dominated Rhythmic Gymnastics in 1980's.

Biography
Diliana Georgieva was selected for the Bulgarian National Team as a native of Pazardzhik. Her breakthrough was at the 1983 World Championships in Strasbourg, when she won the gold medal in the all-around, against her teammates and in the apparatus finals she again won titles for clubs and ribbon finals.

In 1984, Georgieva placed third at the 1984 European Championships but won the gold medal in clubs and ribbon finals. She was highly favored to win the all-around but missed competing at the 1984 Olympics Games because of the Eastern-bloc boycott. She then went to win her second all-around gold medal at the 1985 World Championships. She also won a bronze medal for ribbon and a gold medal for ball, clubs and rope in the event finals.
 
In 1985, Diliana Georgieva retired and married Bulgarian pentathlon champion Vladimir Klintcharov.

In fiction 

 In the shōjo manga Hikari no Densetsu, Georgieva is one of the biggest inspirations for the protagonist, the aspirant gymnast Hikari Kamijou.

References

External links
 
 http://sporta.bg/?id=257&load=OtherSports::Champion ( Golden Girls of Bulgaria )

1965 births
Living people
Bulgarian rhythmic gymnasts
Sportspeople from Pazardzhik
Bulgarian emigrants to New Zealand
Medalists at the Rhythmic Gymnastics World Championships